The 2016–17 Biathlon World Cup – World Cup 1 was the opening event of the season and was held in Östersund, Sweden, from 27 November until 4 December 2016.

Schedule of events

Medal winners

Men

Women

Mixed

References 

Biathlon World Cup - World Cup 1, 2016-17
2016–17 Biathlon World Cup
Biathlon World Cup - World Cup 1
Biathlon World Cup - World Cup 1
Sports competitions in Östersund
Biathlon competitions in Sweden